The 3rd constituency of Ardèche is a French legislative constituency in the Ardèche département.

Deputies

Election results

2022

 
 
 
 
 
|-
| colspan="8" bgcolor="#E9E9E9"|
|-
 
 

 
 
 
 * Ughetto stood as a dissident member of PS, without the support of the NUPES alliance, of which PS is a member.

2017

2012

|- style="background-color:#E9E9E9;text-align:center;"
! colspan="2" rowspan="2" style="text-align:left;" | Candidate
! rowspan="2" colspan="2" style="text-align:left;" | Party
! colspan="2" | 1st round
! colspan="2" | 2nd round
|- style="background-color:#E9E9E9;text-align:center;"
! width="75" | Votes
! width="30" | %
! width="75" | Votes
! width="30" | %
|-
| style="background-color:" |
| style="text-align:left;" | Sabine Buis
| style="text-align:left;" | Socialist Party
| PS
| 
| 33.26%
| 
| 51.23%
|-
| style="background-color:" |
| style="text-align:left;" | Jean-Claude Flory
| style="text-align:left;" | Union for a Popular Movement
| UMP
| 
| 37.22%
| 
| 48.77%
|-
| style="background-color:" |
| style="text-align:left;" | Isabelle Ciet
| style="text-align:left;" | National Front
| FN
| 
| 11.72%
| colspan="2" style="text-align:left;" |
|-
| style="background-color:" |
| style="text-align:left;" | Véronique Louis
| style="text-align:left;" | Left Front
| FG
| 
| 9.16%
| colspan="2" style="text-align:left;" |
|-
| style="background-color:" |
| style="text-align:left;" | Magalie Margotton
| style="text-align:left;" | The Greens
| VEC
| 
| 5.10%
| colspan="2" style="text-align:left;" |
|-
| style="background-color:" |
| style="text-align:left;" | Roger Kappel
| style="text-align:left;" | 
| CEN
| 
| 1.19%
| colspan="2" style="text-align:left;" |
|-
| style="background-color:" |
| style="text-align:left;" | Richard Neuville
| style="text-align:left;" | Far Left
| EXG
| 
| 0.96%
| colspan="2" style="text-align:left;" |
|-
| style="background-color:" |
| style="text-align:left;" | Alain Chalvet
| style="text-align:left;" | Miscellaneous Right
| DVD
| 
| 0.55%
| colspan="2" style="text-align:left;" |
|-
| style="background-color:" |
| style="text-align:left;" | Michel Sabatier
| style="text-align:left;" | Far Left
| EXG
| 
| 0.51%
| colspan="2" style="text-align:left;" |
|-
| style="background-color:" |
| style="text-align:left;" | Béatrice Cauvin
| style="text-align:left;" | Far Left
| EXG
| 
| 0.33%
| colspan="2" style="text-align:left;" |
|-
| colspan="8" style="background-color:#E9E9E9;"|
|- style="font-weight:bold"
| colspan="4" style="text-align:left;" | Total
| 
| 100%
| 
| 100%
|-
| colspan="8" style="background-color:#E9E9E9;"|
|-
| colspan="4" style="text-align:left;" | Registered voters
| 
| style="background-color:#E9E9E9;"|
| 
| style="background-color:#E9E9E9;"|
|-
| colspan="4" style="text-align:left;" | Blank/Void ballots
| 
| 1.16%
| 
| 2.41%
|-
| colspan="4" style="text-align:left;" | Turnout
| 
| 65.89%
| 
| 67.14%
|-
| colspan="4" style="text-align:left;" | Abstentions
| 
| 34.11%
| 
| 32.86%
|-
| colspan="8" style="background-color:#E9E9E9;"|
|- style="font-weight:bold"
| colspan="6" style="text-align:left;" | Result
| colspan="2" style="background-color:" | PS GAIN
|}

2007

|- style="background-color:#E9E9E9;text-align:center;"
! colspan="2" rowspan="2" style="text-align:left;" | Candidate
! rowspan="2" colspan="2" style="text-align:left;" | Party
! colspan="2" | 1st round
! colspan="2" | 2nd round
|- style="background-color:#E9E9E9;text-align:center;"
! width="75" | Votes
! width="30" | %
! width="75" | Votes
! width="30" | %
|-
| style="background-color:" |
| style="text-align:left;" | Jean-Claude Flory
| style="text-align:left;" | Union for a Popular Movement
| UMP
| 
| 46.92%
| 
| 55.59%
|-
| style="background-color:" |
| style="text-align:left;" | Véronique Louis
| style="text-align:left;" | Socialist Party
| PS
| 
| 18.48%
| 
| 44.41%
|-
| style="background-color:" |
| style="text-align:left;" | Stéphane Alaize
| style="text-align:left;" | Miscellaneous Left
| DVG
| 
| 8.29%
| colspan="2" style="text-align:left;" |
|-
| style="background-color:" |
| style="text-align:left;" | Joseph Surrel
| style="text-align:left;" | Democratic Movement
| MoDem
| 
| 4.95%
| colspan="2" style="text-align:left;" |
|-
| style="background-color:" |
| style="text-align:left;" | Mireille Ponton
| style="text-align:left;" | Communist
| COM
| 
| 4.19%
| colspan="2" style="text-align:left;" |
|-
| style="background-color:" |
| style="text-align:left;" | Eric Arnou
| style="text-align:left;" | The Greens
| VEC
| 
| 3.41%
| colspan="2" style="text-align:left;" |
|-
| style="background-color:" |
| style="text-align:left;" | Suzanne Laurent
| style="text-align:left;" | National Front
| FN
| 
| 3.04%
| colspan="2" style="text-align:left;" |
|-
| style="background-color:" |
| style="text-align:left;" | Yann Kindo
| style="text-align:left;" | Far Left
| EXG
| 
| 2.97%
| colspan="2" style="text-align:left;" |
|-
| style="background-color:" |
| style="text-align:left;" | Bernard Brottes
| style="text-align:left;" | Hunting, Fishing, Nature, Traditions
| CPNT
| 
| 2.47%
| colspan="2" style="text-align:left;" |
|-
| style="background-color:" |
| style="text-align:left;" | Daniel Romet
| style="text-align:left;" | Far Left
| EXG
| 
| 1.85%
| colspan="2" style="text-align:left;" |
|-
| style="background-color:" |
| style="text-align:left;" | Jean-Pierre Deho
| style="text-align:left;" | Ecologist
| ECO
| 
| 0.93%
| colspan="2" style="text-align:left;" |
|-
| style="background-color:" |
| style="text-align:left;" | Sandrine Ben Lahoussine
| style="text-align:left;" | Divers
| DIV
| 
| 0.85%
| colspan="2" style="text-align:left;" |
|-
| style="background-color:" |
| style="text-align:left;" | Marie-Paule Finot
| style="text-align:left;" | Movement for France
| MPF
| 
| 0.72%
| colspan="2" style="text-align:left;" |
|-
| style="background-color:" |
| style="text-align:left;" | Colette Largeron
| style="text-align:left;" | Far Left
| EXG
| 
| 0.53%
| colspan="2" style="text-align:left;" |
|-
| style="background-color:" |
| style="text-align:left;" | Sandrine Elvira
| style="text-align:left;" | Far Right
| EXD
| 
| 0.39%
| colspan="2" style="text-align:left;" |
|-
| colspan="8" style="background-color:#E9E9E9;"|
|- style="font-weight:bold"
| colspan="4" style="text-align:left;" | Total
| 
| 100%
| 
| 100%
|-
| colspan="8" style="background-color:#E9E9E9;"|
|-
| colspan="4" style="text-align:left;" | Registered voters
| 
| style="background-color:#E9E9E9;"|
| 
| style="background-color:#E9E9E9;"|
|-
| colspan="4" style="text-align:left;" | Blank/Void ballots
| 
| 1.66%
| 
| 3.11%
|-
| colspan="4" style="text-align:left;" | Turnout
| 
| 66.14%
| 
| 66.07%
|-
| colspan="4" style="text-align:left;" | Abstentions
| 
| 33.86%
| 
| 33.93%
|-
| colspan="8" style="background-color:#E9E9E9;"|
|- style="font-weight:bold"
| colspan="6" style="text-align:left;" | Result
| colspan="2" style="background-color:" | UMP HOLD
|}

2002

 
 
 
 
 
 
 
 
 
|-
| colspan="8" bgcolor="#E9E9E9"|
|-

1997

Sources

 French Interior Ministry results website: 

3